The John B. Schuerholz Baseball Complex is a baseball venue located in Towson, Maryland, United States. It is used by the Towson University Tigers baseball team.  It has a capacity of 500 spectators and opened in 2001. The playing surface of the field is natural grass.

On April 29, 2001, the baseball facility at Towson University was named John B. Schuerholz Park. The stadium is named in honor of John Schuerholz, a 1962 Towson alumnus and former member of the baseball program. His contributions to Towson University allowed the renovations to take place. He is the Vice Chairman Emeritus of the Atlanta Braves.

The renovations to the facility included permanent seating, a press box, and a concessions area.

See also
 List of NCAA Division I baseball venues

References

College baseball venues in the United States
Baseball venues in Maryland
Towson Tigers sports venues
Towson Tigers baseball
Sports venues in the Baltimore metropolitan area